Francis Peter Facione (February 8, 1940 – June 14, 2019) was the Presiding Bishop of the Old Roman Catholic Church in North America. He was born February 8, 1940, to Frank Facione and Catherine (D'Agostino) Facione.
Facione studied pharmacy at Wayne State University and earned a BS in Pharmacy in 1962, a MS in Pharmacy Administration in 1974, and a Ph.D. in Pharmacy Administration in 1982. Realizing his vocation, he entered the Old Roman Catholic Church and was ordained priest on July 14, 1974, by Bishop Andrew Gordon Johnston-Cantrell of the Old Roman Catholic Church English Rite (under Archbishop Robert Alfred Burns). He was later consecrated a bishop on November 30, 1974, as the Titular Archbishop of Devon. He was elected on January 5, 1974, as presiding bishop and renamed the church the Old Roman Catholic Church in North America-Ultrajectine Tradition.
In 1991 the church moved to Louisville, Kentucky, and was headquartered at St. Mark's Old Roman Catholic Church. 

Facione died on June 14, 2019.

References

External links 
 Council of Old Roman Catholic Bishops
 A Historic Overview of the Old Roman Catholic Church by Archbishop Francis Facione

American Old Catholics
Presiding bishops
2019 deaths
1940 births
Wayne State University alumni